Club Deportivo Elementar Ursaria is a Spanish football team based in Madrid. Founded in 2007, it plays in Tercera División RFEF – Group 7, holding home matches at Estadio Polideportivo La Dehesa, with a capacity of 1,500 people.

History
Founded in 2007 as Club Deportivo Latina by Manolo Blázquez, the club changed name to Club Deportivo Ursaria in June 2018, after being acquired by businessman Ricardo Badoer. In the first season under the new ownership, the club achieved promotion to the Preferente de Madrid, and in 2021, the club achieved their first-ever promotion to the Tercera División RFEF.

Season to season

1 season in Tercera División RFEF

Notes

References

External links
 
Soccerway team profile

Football clubs in the Community of Madrid
Association football clubs established in 2007
2007 establishments in Spain